The Gulf Coast Athletic Conference (GCAC) is a college athletic conference made up entirely of historically black colleges and universities (HBCUs) that's affiliated with the National Association of Intercollegiate Athletics (NAIA). Member institutions are located in the states of Alabama, Arkansas, Florida, Louisiana, and Mississippi, with a future member located in the U.S. territory of the U.S. Virgin Islands

History

The GCAC was established in 1981, with the following charter institutions: Belhaven University, Dillard University, Louisiana College (now Louisiana Christian University), Spring Hill College, Tougaloo College, William Carey University, and Xavier University of Louisiana. The first sports were men and women's basketball and men's tennis, with other sports soon following.

The University of Mobile was admitted in October 1985, Southern University at New Orleans was granted admission in May 1986, Loyola University was admitted in April 1995, and Louisiana State University in Shreveport became a member in April 2000. In 2005, Hurricane Katrina forced Dillard and Xavier (Louisiana) to cancel all athletic competition for the 2005–06 season and Loyola and Southern–New Orleans were able only to compete partially. All schools returned to competition in 2006–07, although in most cases with a reduced number of sports.

Louisiana College left the GCAC to join the American Southwest Conference of the National Collegiate Athletic Association (NCAA) Division III in 2000. Belhaven also left in 2000, only to re-join in 2002; while Talladega College, which joined in 1999, left in 2002. In 2010, Belhaven, Loyola–New Orleans, Spring Hill, Mobile, and William Carey left the GCAC to join the Southern States Athletic Conference (SSAC). In 2010 LSU–Shreveport left the conference to join the Red River Athletic Conference (RRAC). Edward Waters College and Fisk University joined to replace the departed schools in 2010. Philander Smith College also joined the GCAC in 2011. Talladega College re-joined the conference starting in the 2011–12 academic year. Talladega had been a member of the GCAC from 1999–2000 to 2001–02.

On April 17, 2018, it was announced that Rust College had joined the GCAC in the 2018–19 season.

In 2019, Steve Martin resigned from the conference after 5 years to become commissioner of the Mississippi Association of Community and Junior Colleges

In 2019, Southern University at New Orleans suspended its sports program.

On September 14, 2020, it was also announced that Xavier (La.) would leave the GCAC for the RRAC and on December 18, Talladega was accepted by the SSAC as a new member. Both departures became effective after the 2020–21 season concluded, coinciding with Fisk's return to the GCAC as published on March 16, 2021. On July 19, it was reported that Edward Waters would leave the GCAC to join NCAA Division II for the first time in its history and re-join the Southern Intercollegiate Athletic Conference the 2021–22 season.

In October 2021, Southern at New Orleans began to offer sports again after adding a student fee to fund them. On January 20, 2022, the GCAC extended its membership to Oakwood University and Wiley College, the conference's first Texas member, in addition to the returning Southern at New Orleans. Oakwood and Wiley joined the conference later in July. On November 3, the GCAC invited the University of the Virgin Islands to become its member in 2023–24, becoming the first four-year institution in a U.S. territory to join an athletic conference affiliated with the NAIA or NCAA in more than a century.

Chronological timeline
 1981 - The Gulf Coast Athletic Conference (GCAC) was founded. Charter members included Belhaven College (now Belhaven University), Dillard University, Louisiana College (now Louisiana Christian University), Spring Hill College, Tougaloo College, William Carey College (William Carey University) and Xavier University of Louisiana beginning the 1981-82 academic year.
 1985 - Mobile College (now the University of Mobile) joined the GCAC in the 1985-86 academic year.
 1986 - Southern University at New Orleans joined the GCAC in the 1986-87 academic year.
 1995 - Loyola University (now Loyola University New Orleans) joined the GCAC in the 1995-96 academic year.
 1999 - Talladega College joined the GCAC in the 1999-2000 academic year.
 2000 - Two institutions left the GCAC to join their respective new home primary conferences: Belhaven to become an NAIA Independent, and Louisiana College to join the Division III ranks of the National Collegiate Athletic Association (NCAA) and the American Southwest Conference, both effective after the 1999-2000 academic year.
 2000 - Louisiana State University at Shreveport (a.k.a. Louisiana State–Shreveport or LSU–Shreveport) joined the GCAC in the 2000-01 academic year.
 2002 - Talladega left the GCAC to become an NAIA Independent after the 2001-02 academic year.
 2002 - Belhaven re-joined the GCAC in the 2002-03 academic year.
 2005 - Dillard and Xavier (La.) cancelled all athletic competition while Loyola (La.) and Southern–New Orleans competed in partial competition due to the aftermath of Hurricane Katrina during the 2005-06 academic year.
 2010 - Six institutions left the GCAC to join their respective new home primary conferences: Loyola (La.), Mobile, Spring Hill and William Carey (with Belhaven for a second time) to join the Southern States Athletic Conference (SSAC), and Louisiana State–Shreveport (or LSU–Shreveport) to join the Red River Athletic Conference (RRAC), all effective after the 2009-10 academic year.
 2010 - Edward Waters College (now Edward Waters University) and Fisk University joined the GCAC in the 2010-11 academic year.
 2011 - Philander Smith College joined the GCAC (with Talladega re-joining) in the 2011-12 academic year.
 2013 - Voorhees College (now Voorhees University) joined the GCAC in the 2013-14 academic year.
 2014 - Fisk left the GCAC to become an NAIA Independent after the 2013-14 academic year.
 2015 - Voorhees left the GCAC to become an NAIA Independent after the 2014-15 academic year.
 2018 - Rust College joined the GCAC in the 2018-19 academic year.
 2019 - Southern–New Orleans left the GCAC due to suspending its athletic program until further notice after the 2018-19 academic year.
 2021 - Three institutions left the GCAC to join their respective new home primary conferences: Talladega for a second time to join the SSAC, Xavier (La.) to join the RRAC, and Edward Waters to join the NCAA Division II ranks and re-joining the Southern Intercollegiate Athletic Conference (SIAC), all effective after the 2020-21 academic year; although Edward Waters would remain in the GCAC to compete in conference tournaments for all sponsored sports during the provisional transition until the end of the 2021-22 academic year.
 2021 - Fisk re-joined the GCAC in the 2021-22 academic year.
 2022 - Southern–New Orleans announced that it would reinstate its athletics program and rejoin the GCAC, along with new members Oakwood University and Wiley College beginning the 2022-23 academic year.
 2022 – The GCAC extended a membership invitation for the 2023–24 academic year to the University of the Virgin Islands, the first from a U.S. territory to join an NAIA or NCAA conference in the 21st century.

Member schools

Current members
The GCAC currently has eight full members; all are private schools:

Notes

Future member
The GCAC will have one new full member, also a public school:

Former members
The GCAC had 12 former full members, all but two were private schools:

Notes

Membership timeline

Conference sports

Conference champions

Baseball

References

External links
 

 
College sports in Alabama
College sports in Arkansas
College sports in Louisiana
College sports in Mississippi
College sports in Texas